Lindborg: 
 Ida Lindborg (born 13 June 1994) is a Swedish swimmer. She competed at the 2016 Summer Olympics in Rio de Janeiro. 
 Sara Lindborg (born November 30, 1983) is a Swedish cross-country skier who has competed since 2002. 
 Nathalie Lindborg (born 15 April 1991) is a Swedish swimmer.